The 1993 Internationaux de Strasbourg was a women's tennis tournament played on outdoor clay courts in Strasbourg, France that was part of Tier III of the 1993 WTA Tour. It was the seventh edition of the tournament and was held from 17 May until 23 May 1993. Fifth-seeded Naoko Sawamatsu won the singles title and earned $25,000 first-prize money.

Finals

Singles

 Naoko Sawamatsu defeated  Judith Wiesner 4–6, 6–1, 6–3
 It was Sawamatsu's 1st title of the year and the 2nd of her career.

Doubles

 Shaun Stafford /  Andrea Temesvári defeated  Jill Hetherington /  Kathy Rinaldi 6–7(5–7), 6–3, 6–4

References

External links
 ITF tournament edition details 
 Tournament draws

Internationaux de Strasbourg
1993
Internationaux de Strasbourg
May 1993 sports events in Europe